Gyda is an offshore oil field located in the southern Norwegian section of North Sea along with Ula, Tambar and Tambar East fields making up the UGT area, usually attributed to DONG Energy's main areas of exploration and production activity. The Gyda field was discovered in 1980 and started producing on June 21, 1990.  The field contains confirmed 39.6 million m3 of oil and 6.6 billion cubic meter of natural gas.

Ownership
Originally developed by BP, in 2003 it sold its interests (61%) in the Gyda Oil Field to the Canada-based Talisman Energy for $90 million. Talisman operated the field until it was inherited by Repsol in 2015 as part of the acquisition of Talisman and assumed the operatorship on behalf of the licence.
 Partners of Talisman Energy, DONG Energy and Norske AEDC AS (NAEDC),owned by Arabian Oil Company (AOC), hold 34% and 5% interest in the project, respectively. holds 34% Capital spending on Gyda was expected to be $131 million.

Production

The field has one conventional steel facility with production, drilling, living quarters. The field also produces excessive amount of water making the oil production stable. Due to the difficulties, the production license was extended to 2018. Several new wells are currently being drilled. The produced oil is transported by a pipeline to Ekofisk oil field and on to Teesside for refining.

See also
Ula oil field
Oselvar oil field
Ekofisk oil field
Norpipe
North Sea oil
Economy of Norway

References

External links
 Talisman Energy official website 

Former Ørsted (company) oil and gas fields
North Sea oil fields
Oil fields in Norway